The 2001 Women's World Floorball Championships was the third world championship in women's floorball. The games were played in Riga, Latvia 20–27 May 2001. Finland ended up as champions, thus they became the first team to win their second title. In the final-game Finland defeated Sweden, 2-0.

Great Britain, Hungary & Poland made their first appearances in the women's floorball world championships.

Division A
The 8 teams of the first division consists of the 7 best placed teams from the highest division the previous tournament plus , the winner of division B the previous tournament.
Austria lost the 7th place match versus  and was then relegated back to division B for the next tournament.

The two best placed teams in each group advances to the semifinals. The lower placed teams face up against the corresponding team from the other group for placement matches.

Group A

Group B

Final stage

Top scorers

Division B
The second division consisted of the 4 bottom placed teams from the last tournament plus three new teams Great Britain, Hungary, Poland and Russia who were relegated from the top division following their withdrawal from the previous tournament.
Russia did however get promoted back to the top division for the next tournament after a clean sweep, beating Denmark in the division final with 14-1 and having a total goal difference by +60.

The two best placed teams from each group advances to B-semifinals. The rest of the teams advances to play the corresponding team from the other group i placement matches.

Group C

Group D

Placement matches

Top scorers

Final standings

Division A

*Austria relegated to division B for 2003

Division B

*Russia promoted to division A for 2003

All-star team
The pick of Latvian Rudīte Danovska as the best goalkeeper in the tournament made her the first player outside of Sweden, Finland, Norway and Switzerland to be included in a world championship all-star team. Birgitte Lersbryggen was included in the all-star team for her second back-to-back tournament.

Goalkeeper: 
Defender: 
Defender: 
Centre: 
Forward: 
Forward: 

MVP:

See also
IFF Tournament Site

References

Floorball World Championships
Women's World Floorball Championships
Women's World Floorball Championships
Floorball in Latvia
International sports competitions hosted by Latvia
May 2001 sports events in Europe
Sports competitions in Riga
2000s in Riga